The Land Compensation Act 1961 (c 33) is an Act of Parliament of the United Kingdom, which concerns English land law and compulsory purchase. The majority of this Act was brought into force on 1 August 1961, with Part V s.42 coming into force on 22 July 1961.

The Act consolidated several earlier Acts of Parliament which concerned compensation for compulsory purchase, most notably the Acquisition of Land (Assessment of Compensation) Act 1919.

Contents

Part I – Determination of Questions of Disputed Compensation 
Section 1 provides that where land is acquired under compulsory purchase, any disputed compensation should be decided by the Upper Tribunal in accordance with this Act, as amended by The Transfer of Tribunal Functions (Lands Tribunal and Miscellaneous Amendments) Order 2009. Section 4A was inserted by the Housing and Planning Act 2016.

Part II – Provisions Determining Amount of Compensation 
Part II sets out the provisions which must be applied to determine the amount of compensation owed to owners of land which has been acquired under the compulsory purchase scheme. Section 5 Rule 2 provides that the owner of an interest in land (e.g. a freehold, leasehold, or easement as in Re Ellenborough Park) should receive the open market value of the property. This is defined as the "value of the land... if sold on an open market by a willing seller". The amount of compensation owed to the landowner is not affected by the land acquisition being compulsory, the special suitability of the land for a particular purpose or any unlawful existing use. However, this does not exclude additional compensation owed to the landowner for disturbance.

The Neighbourhood Planning Act 2017 inserted an additional Rule 2A, which requires the compensation to be calculated in accordance with the no-scheme rules in sections 6A. This codified the ruling in the case of Pointe Gourde Quarrying & Transport Co v Sub-Intendent of Crown Lands. The Privy Council ruled that that compensation could not include any increases which were the result of the scheme for which the acquiring authority was purchasing the land. In addition, the no-scheme rules in the Act disregard any decrease in value which is the result of the scheme. The land must be valued as if there was never any scheme, and the valuers must imagine what developments would or would not have occurred in its place.

The original planning assumptions in sections 14-17 of the Act were amended by the Localism Act 2011. They allow land to be valued for its existing use, or valued by taking into account any planning permission which was in force on the valuation date, the potential future grant of planning permission, or appropriate alternative development.

Part III – Certification By Planning Authorities of Appropriate Alternative Development 
Section 17 says that either the acquiring authority or the landowner can ask the local planning authority for a certificate which states whether there is a development which would satisfy the test for appropriate alternative development.

Part IV – Compensation where Permission for Additional Development Granted after Acquisition 
This Part was omitted by the Neighbourhood Planning Act 2017.

Part V – Miscellaneous and General

See also

English land law
Compulsory purchase

Notes

References
K Gray and SF Gray, Land Law (7th edn 2011) Ch 11
K Gray and S Gray, ‘Private Property and Public Propriety’, in J McLean (ed), Property and the Constitution (Hart 1999) 36-7

English land law
United Kingdom Acts of Parliament 1961